Chrosioderma is a genus of Malagasy huntsman spiders that was first described by Eugène Louis Simon in 1897.

Species
 it contains nine species, found on Madagascar:
Chrosioderma albidum Simon, 1897 (type) – Madagascar
Chrosioderma analalava Silva-Dávila, 2005 – Madagascar
Chrosioderma havia Silva-Dávila, 2005 – Madagascar
Chrosioderma mahavelona Silva-Dávila, 2005 – Madagascar
Chrosioderma mipentinapentina Silva-Dávila, 2005 – Madagascar
Chrosioderma namoroka Silva-Dávila, 2005 – Madagascar
Chrosioderma ranomafana Silva-Dávila, 2005 – Madagascar
Chrosioderma roaloha Silva-Dávila, 2005 – Madagascar
Chrosioderma soalala Silva-Dávila, 2005 – Madagascar

See also
 List of Sparassidae species

References

Araneomorphae genera
Sparassidae
Spiders of Madagascar